Serrana Bank is a Colombian-administered atoll in the western Caribbean Sea. It is a mostly underwater reef about 50 km long and 13 km wide and has six cays, or islets, the largest of which is Southwest Cay.

Geography 
The cays from south to north are:
    Southwest Cay (500 by 200 meters)
    South Cay (150 by 25 meters)
    Little Cay (less than 100 meters in diameter)
    East Cay (80 by 40 meters)
    Narrow Cay
    North Cay

History 

Serrana Bank is believed to be named after the Spanish castaway Pedro Serrano. It was first shown on a Dutch map in 1545 with this name.  They were mapped more extensively by the English in 1660.  A former base for the US military, it is now mostly visited by lobster fishermen. It is now Colombian territory, though it was formerly claimed by the United States. On September 8, 1972, the two countries signed a treaty recognizing Colombia's sovereignty over Roncador Cay, and Serrana Bank and abandoning American sovereignty over Quita Sueño Bank. A fishing concession was retained by the United States over the three banks. This treaty became effective on  September 17, 1981. On November 19, 2012, in regard to Nicaraguan claims to the islands, the International Court of Justice (ICJ) reaffirmed Colombia's sovereignty.

On September 3, 2007 the eye of Category 5 Hurricane Felix passed over Serrana Bank.

See also
 List of Guano Island claims

References

External links
Light House Details
Serrana Bank

Caribbean islands of Colombia
Atolls of Colombia
Islands of the West Caribbean
Caribbean islands claimed under the Guano Islands Act
Former regions and territories of the United States
Islands of the Archipelago of San Andrés, Providencia and Santa Catalina
Former disputed islands